Donatello Brown (born May 15, 1991) is an American football cornerback who is a free agent. He played college football at Valdosta State. He is the uncle of wide receiver John Brown.

Professional career

Green Bay Packers
Brown signed with the Green Bay Packers as an undrafted free agent on May 5, 2017. He was waived by the Packers on September 2, 2017 and was signed to the practice squad the next day. He was promoted to the active roster on November 17, 2017.

He was re-signed on March 12, 2018. After training camp, he was waived by the Packers on September 1, 2018.

Atlanta Legends
Brown signed with the Atlanta Legends of the Alliance of American Football for the 2019 season. The league ceased operations in April 2019.

Dallas/Arlington Renegades
Brown was drafted in the 9th round during phase four in the 2020 XFL Draft by the Dallas Renegades. He had his contract terminated when the league suspended operations on April 10, 2020.

Brown was drafted again by the Renegades on Nov 16, 2022 in the 2023 XFL Draft for the 2023 XFL season.

NFL career statistics

Regular season

References

External links
Valdosta State Blazers bio
Green Bay Packers bio

1991 births
Living people
American football cornerbacks
Arlington Renegades players
Atlanta Legends players
Dallas Renegades players
Green Bay Packers players
Players of American football from Florida
Sportspeople from Coral Springs, Florida
Valdosta State Blazers football players